Steve Steinwedel (born July 18, 1953) is an American former college basketball coach who most notably coached for ten seasons at Delaware.

Coaching career
After a player career at Mississippi State, Steinwedel began his coaching career as an assistant at Stetson, before moving on to assistant coaching spots at West Virginia, Duke, and South Carolina. He was named the head coach at Delaware in 1985. During the 1991-92 season, with future NBA Draft selection Spencer Dunkley on the team, Steinwedel led the Fightin' Blue Hens to a school record 27-4 mark, and went an undefeated 14-0 in the North Atlantic Conference en route to the 1992 NCAA Tournament. It was followed up by another tournament appearance in 1993. Despite the success, Steienwedel was forced to resign in 1995.

Post-coaching career
Stienwedel never coached college basketball after leaving Delaware, but stayed in the area working as a counselor. He currently serves as the director and co-founder of the Community for Integrative Learning.

College coaching record

References 

1953 births
Living people
American men's basketball coaches
American men's basketball players
Basketball coaches from Indiana
Basketball players from Indiana
Delaware Fightin' Blue Hens men's basketball coaches
Duke Blue Devils men's basketball coaches
Mississippi State Bulldogs men's basketball players
People from Seymour, Indiana
South Carolina Gamecocks men's basketball coaches
Stetson Hatters men's basketball coaches
West Virginia Mountaineers men's basketball coaches